The Brittas Empire is a British sitcom created and originally written by Andrew Norriss and Richard Fegen. Chris Barrie played titular character Gordon Brittas, the well-intended but hugely incompetent manager of the fictional Whitbury New Town Leisure Centre.

The show ran for seven series and 52 episodes – including two Christmas specials – from 1991 to 1997 on BBC1. Creators Norriss and Fegen co-wrote the first five series. The series peaked at 10 million viewers. In 2022, the series was described by Daily Mirror as "fondly-remembered".

The Brittas Empire enjoyed a long and successful run throughout the 1990s, and gained large mainstream audiences. In 2004 the show came 47th on the BBC's Britain's Best Sitcom poll, and all series have been released on DVD both individually as series and as a complete boxset. Best of the Britcoms noted the series has been hailed as "the Fawlty Towers of the 1990s" due to its "fast-paced, outrageous [comedy] full of inventive gags".

The creators Andrew Norriss and Richard Fegen often combined farce with either surreal or dramatic elements in episodes. For example, in the first series, the leisure centre prepares for a royal visit, only for the doors to seal, the boiler room to flood and a visitor to become electrocuted. Unlike many traditional sitcoms, deaths were quite commonplace in The Brittas Empire. Barrie described the humour as "straightfoward, slapstick, very accessible characters, larger-than-life abnormal things happening in a very normal situation".

The Brittas Empire was "quietly revolutionary" for featuring two gay male characters, "neither remotely camp yet both very funny", which was a first for a television comedy.

Plot summary

Gordon Brittas (Chris Barrie) is the well-meaning but incompetent manager of Whitbury New Town Leisure Centre. He trained at the fictional Aldershot Leisure Centre. Completely tactless, totally annoying, and forever coming up with 'half-baked' ideas (and oblivious to all of his aforementioned faults), Brittas frequently upsets his staff, public, and his frazzled wife Helen (Pippa Haywood), often bringing confusion and chaos into their lives. Helen Brittas finds coping with Gordon increasingly difficult and often turns to medication and affairs with other men to maintain her sanity.

Helen is often helped by her supportive friend Laura Lancing (Julia St John), Brittas' calm, efficient deputy manager. Though she is fully aware of his incompetence and the annoyance he causes his colleagues and customers, Laura has a grudging admiration for Brittas, regarding him as honest and decent. His other deputy manager is the dim-witted but kind Colin Weatherby (Mike Burns) (credited as Michael Burns in series 1, 2 and 3). Colin has several medical problems including skin allergies, a constantly bandaged infected hand, and a sizeable boil on his face. Technically a deputy manager, he works more efficiently as the centre's caretaker.

The other core members of the team are Carole (Harriet Thorpe) the unfortunate, often tearful receptionist, who keeps her three children in the reception drawers and cupboards; the gentle-hearted Gavin (Tim Marriott) who becomes Deputy Manager in Series 5; his paranoid, sometimes-manic partner Tim (Russell Porter); lively, principled Linda (Jill Greenacre); and Julie (Judy Flynn), Brittas' sarcastic secretary, who hates her boss and refuses to do any work for him.

Outside the core staff is Councillor Jack Drugett (Stephen Churchett), who is unable to sack Brittas despite numerous attempts.

Cast alterations in the series: 'Angie' (Andrée Bernard), who appears as a main character in the first series, is replaced by 'Julie' from series two onwards. 'Laura' left the show after series five, at the same time as the creators and writers.  She is replaced in series six by the character 'Penny' (Anouschka Menzies). 'Penny' did not return in series seven.

According to Barrie, Gordon Brittas is well-meaning but insensitive because he has a lofty dream to make the world a better place, but he doesn't know how to execute it on the small-scale. At the same time Barrie was playing Brittas, he was also playing his other well-known role of Arnold Rimmer in Red Dwarf. Both characters had similar personality flaws (although Brittas always attempted to be friendly to those around him while Rimmer treated everyone with nothing but contempt) and even some of their history matched; for instance both characters had brief and unsuccessful stints at the Samaritans. Unlocking your potential describes Colin as a habitual 'yes' man, who seeks validation through compliance. While Gordon himself is a larger than life creation, he is balanced out by his slightly more 'normal' long suffering staff as foil to offset his antics.

Episodes

The Brittas Empire was broadcast for 52 episodes between 1991 and 1997, spanning seven series and two Christmas Specials, along with one short episode for Children in Need. The cast also performed in the 1996 Royal Variety Performance. Chris Barrie played Brittas again in the short fitness series spin-off, Get Fit with Brittas.

For the first five series the show's creators Richard Fegen and Andrew Norriss co-wrote every episode. After series 5 they left, along with actress Julia St John who played deputy manager Laura. At the end of Series 5 Norriss and Fegen killed off Brittas when he was crushed to death by a falling water tank. This was originally meant to be the end of the show's run.

However, the show's huge popularity meant the BBC resurrected Brittas and brought on a new team of writers who carried the show on for a further two series and one further Christmas special in 1996. These writers were: Paul Smith (who also wrote the series seven episode "Malcolm ex" for Andrew Marshall's 2point4 Children), Terry Kyan, Tony Millan, Mike Walling, Ian Davidson and Peter Vincent.

"Curse of the Tiger Women" is the final episode which aired in 1997. This ending claims all seven series were part of a dream that Brittas is having on his way to the job interview for manager of the leisure centre. It is an ending that is not well regarded by many critics and viewers and is viewed as a poor ending for such a well loved and popular show.

Episodes of the show were shown at the 1992 Visions convention.

Tickets for the live recordings were available by writing to the BBC TV Ticket unit - while tickets were free, participants had to be aged 14 and up.

The series was rerun on Gold in 2009.

In 2014, Chris Barrie reprised his role as Gordon Brittas for a brief appearance in the Sport Relief music video, "Word Up!" by Little Mix.

On 9 September 2021, Forces TV began repeating the series.

On 6 March 2023, Drama began repeating the series. 

Series 1-5 are currently available to subscribers of BritBox in both the United Kingdom and the United States of America.

DVD and VHS releases
All seven series were released on DVD in the United Kingdom by Eureka Video, and also in Australia by the Australian Broadcasting Corporation. The Eureka releases are now out of print. Prior to these DVD releases, the BBC brought episodes to VHS in the 1990s.

The VHS title: The Brittas Empire - Laying the Foundations VHS was released; it features: 'Laying the Foundations' (Series 1: Episode 1), 'Back from the dead' (Series 2: Episode 1), 'Set in Concrete' (Series 2: Episode 4), 'An Inspector Calls' (Series 2: Episode 3) and 'The Trial' (Series 3: Episode 1).
Then on 7 August 1995, Brittas Empire - The Stuff of Dreams was released and features the episodes: 'The Christening' (Series 4: Episode 2), 'The Stuff of Dreams' (Series 3: Episode 6) and 'Not a Good Day' (Series 4: Episode 1).
From 2003, Eureka Video began bringing the entire series to DVD, in single series box sets. The Brittas Empire - Complete Series One was released on 21 July 2003, followed by series two on 20 October 2003, and then series three was released on 29 January 2004. Series four was released in the same year on 29 July, and the final series by Norriss and Fegen, series five, was released on 4 October 2004.
The Brittas Empire, Complete Series Six was released on 21 February 2005, and the final series along with the 1996 Christmas Special, was released on 23 May 2005.
The Brittas Empire, Complete Series One-Seven, a set comprising the entire series, was released on 8 October 2007.

DVD release dates

Critical response
The series has received a highly positive reception from critics and fans, and has been analysed for its themes.

The book Writing Dialogue for Scripts argues that the show's comedy is largely fuelled by the dramatic irony of the audience knowing that the main character is not important, while he believes he is, and compared Brittas to Captain Mainwaring in Dad's Army. Critics John Lewis and Penny Stempel noted the series' theme of "an incompetent in charge of others" in the vein of TV humour from Dad's Army to Are You Being Served?, coupled with an element of absurdism. The Shakespeare Library lists it as an example of a TV show that has fun with the idea of a man given a little power and authority that goes to his head. I'm Too Busy to be Stressed described Gordon as a classic example of an over-compensating individual who exhibits a sense of authority to camouflage the inferiority beneath.

British Comedy Guide writes in 2021 that "Thirty years since its debut on television screens and The Brittas Empire has aged very well." The character has been described by critics as a popular portrayal of an Aspergers character along with Mr Bean, as they both demonstrate inappropriate social behaviour. According to the Eastern Europe Travel Survivors Kit 1994, shows like The Brittas Empire and American primetime soap opera Dynasty formed the backbone of Poland's two state TV channels. British Cultural Identities felt the series successful critiqued contemporary British pretensions. Red Dwarf Smegazine argued in 1993 that while Red Dwarf had been a success, "Chris [Barrie] is perhaps better known by many TV viewers for The Brittas Empire". The Encyclopedia of TV Science Fiction wrote that the series saw Barrie achieve more mainstream success.

Revival 

Talks of a Christmas special or a revival were raised in 2015, though ultimately neither project were picked up. On a revival, The Guardian wrote that while the original run "never really entered the fabric of popular culture...arguably, tastes have advanced enough for people to warm to a mainstream sitcom that includes the chainsaw dismemberment of several innocent people". In 2017, Digital Spy wrote, that the show "arguably inspired Ricky Gervais' The Office in the early noughties, which went on to have huge success – so it's only natural The Brittas Empire may be in for a reboot". In 2018, a Comic Relief producer worked with Barrie to get a Brittas Empire skit on the programme, but were unsuccessful.

In October 2020, the cast and original writers attended the re-launching the Ringwood Recreation Centre, where the series was filmed, and Barrie hoped the event would be a catalyst for an eighth series. He advised "there's so much momentum for it now's the time." At this stage, original writers, Andrew Norriss and Richard Fegen, were working on a new script. In a 2021 reunion, the cast mentioned that they were still keen to revive the show, though the hiccup was finding a broadcaster to pick it up.

Influence
The show has been credited with having an influence on Alan Partridge and The Office.

Setting
The exterior shots and interior swimming pools of 'Whitbury New Town Leisure Centre' were filmed at Ringwood Leisure Centre, Hampshire.

References

External links

1991 British television series debuts
1997 British television series endings
1990s British black comedy television series
1990s British sitcoms
BBC television sitcoms
1990s British satirical television series
English-language television shows
1990s British workplace comedy television series